Raphael Nathan Nota Rabinovicz (Rabbinovicz/Rabbinowitz) (1835–Nov 28, 1888) authored Dikdukei Soferim (Dikdukei Sofrim), a 15 volume work containing variant readings of half the six orders of the Mishna and two tractates of the Babylonian Talmud. Although he published/republished various other works, including a feature he titled Kunteres Dikdukei Soferim that appeared in a weekly Hebrew-language periodical, his magnum opus came out 1867-1886. His research included visiting various European libraries. Noteworthy is its introduction's history of printings of the Talmud. A sixteenth volume was published posthumously (1897).

The timing of his work enabled him to use one font for the standard (Romm) Talmud and another for variants.

One translation of the title "Dikdukei Sofrim" and the idea behind it is "Fine Points of the Oral Law."

References

Jewish writers